Alexikakos, the "averter of evil", was an epithet given by the ancient Greeks to several deities such as Zeus and Apollo, who was worshipped under this name by the Athenians, because he was believed to have stopped the plague which raged at Athens in the time of the Peloponnesian War. It was also applied to Heracles.

There is a statue of Apollo in the Museo delle Terme in Rome, a Roman copy of a Greek original, that is thought to be a copy of the statue of Apollo Alexicacus by Calamis that stood in the Ceramicus of Athens.

Notes

References

 Pausanias, Description of Greece with an English Translation by W.H.S. Jones, Litt.D., and H.A. Ormerod, M.A., in 4 Volumes. Cambridge, MA, Harvard University Press; London, William Heinemann Ltd. 1918. . Online version at the Perseus Digital Library
 Pausanias, Graeciae Descriptio. 3 vols. Leipzig, Teubner. 1903.  Greek text available at the Perseus Digital Library.

Epithets of Apollo
Epithets of Zeus
Epithets of Heracles